The 2004–05 Welsh Premier League was the 13th season of the Welsh Premier League since its establishment as the League of Wales in 1992. It began on 14 August 2004 and ended on 29 April 2005. The league was won by Total Network Solutions, their second title.

League table

Results

References

Cymru Premier seasons
1
Wales